Pacific! is a Swedish musical duo from Gothenburg consisting of Daniel Högberg and Björn Synneby playing electro.

Discography

Albums 
 Reveries (2008)
 Narcissus (2010)

Singles
Break Your Social System (2007)
Sunset Blvd (2007)
Hot Lips (2007)
Number One (2007)
Narcissus (2010)
Unspoken (2011)

Swedish indie pop groups